Fahrija Dautbegović (born 15 November 1943) is a retired Bosnian-Herzegovinian football goalkeeper. Best known for his six years with NK Dinamo Zagreb where he was a member of the starting lineup between 1967 and 1972, he was also capped twice for Yugoslavia.

Club career
He began his career at Rudar Kakanj, from where he joined NK Dinamo Zagreb in 1967. He then played for TSV 1860 München before coming back to SFR Yugoslavia with NK Olimpija, FK Sarajevo and NK Iskra Bugojno.

International career
He made his debut for Yugoslavia in a September 1969 friendly match against the Soviet Union and has earned a total of 2 caps, scoring no goals. His second and final international was a November 1970 friendly against West Germany.

References

External links

Player profile on Yugoslavia / Serbia National Team page

1943 births
Living people
People from Donji Vakuf
Association football goalkeepers
Yugoslav footballers
Yugoslavia international footballers
FK Rudar Kakanj players
GNK Dinamo Zagreb players
TSV 1860 Munich players
FK Sarajevo players
NK Olimpija Ljubljana (1945–2005) players
NK Iskra Bugojno players
Yugoslav First League players
2. Bundesliga players
Yugoslav expatriate footballers
Expatriate footballers in Germany
Yugoslav expatriate sportspeople in Germany